Friday Afternoon in the Universe is an album by the experimental jazz fusion trio Medeski Martin & Wood. The album title is taken from the opening sentence of "Old Angel Midnight", by Jack Kerouac.

Critical reception

Trouser Press wrote: "Short, rough-hewn vignettes like 'Paper Bass' and 'Tea' are pure improvisation, instantaneous explorations building into massive, irresistible grooves." The Washington Post stated that "the three players move as one through impressionistic, atmospheric patches into driving funk grooves and then off onto spacey tangents."

Track listing
All music by Medeski Martin & Wood except where noted in parentheses.

"The Lover" – 6:19
"Paper Bass" – 0:56
"House Mop" – 3:46
"Last Chance to Dance Trance (Perhaps)" – 7:32
"Baby Clams" – 1:14
"We're So Happy" – 8:17
"Shack" – 3:02
"Tea" – 1:12
"Chinoiserie" (Duke Ellington) – 5:44
"Between Two Limbs" – 1:04
"Sequel" – 5:24
"Friday Afternoon in the Universe" – 6:01
"Billy's Tool Box" – 0:35
"Chubb Sub" – 5:02
"Khob Khun Krub"  (Carl Green) – 0:47

Performers
John Medeski – organ, piano, wurlitzer, clavinet
Billy Martin – drums, percussion
Chris Wood – acoustic bass, harmonica, wood flute
Danny Blume – guitar
Tonino Benson – raygun, vocals
Carl Green – Thai flute

Credits
Edited by Bob Ward, Current Sounds, NYC
Mastering by Dr. Toby Mountain, Northeastern Digital Recording

References

1995 albums
Medeski Martin & Wood albums
Gramavision Records albums